The PSA EW/DW engine is a family of straight-4 black-top automobile engines manufactured by the PSA Group for use in their Peugeot and Citroën automobiles. The EW/DW family was introduced in 1998 as a replacement for the XU engine. All DW engines are produced as part of a joint-venture with Ford Motor Company.

The EW/DW uses many parts from the XU, most notably the crankshaft, but is built with lighter materials. The EW name is used for the petrol engines ("e" for essence) and DW for Diesel engines.

They are mainly used for large family cars and executive cars, as well as large MPVs, although the 2.0 L is also used for some hot hatch models.

Turbocharged versions started using common rail and received the commercial designation HDi. The DW10 served as the basis for the Ford/PSA engine partnership using second generation common rail and a variable-geometry turbocharger for the first time on the 2.0 L design.

DW8
The DW8 is for all intents and purposes an evolution of the XUD9 and was the only diesel engine in the family not to feature a turbocharger or common-rail direct injection. It was mainly used in vans such as the Citroën Berlingo and Peugeot Partner but can also be found in more affordable versions of the Peugeot 206 and 306. The DW8 was phased out in 2007 as it does not pass Euro 4 emissions regulations (it is a Euro 3 engine). The DW8 is matched to the BE manual 5-speed and has  of torque.

Specifications

Displacement: 

Valves: 8 valve, single overhead cam

Bore x Stroke: 

Compression Ratio: 23.0:1

Power output: 

Torque:  at 2500 rpm

Production Start Date: 1 June 2000

DW10
The 2.0 L DW10 was the first PSA Diesel engine to feature common rail direct injection, and was given the commercial designation HDi. It was initially available in  form, with two valves per cylinder and a non-intercooled turbo.

Suzuki was a customer for these powerplants, using them in the European Vitara, Grand Vitara, and Grand Vitara XL-7. Eurovan-based commercial vans, the Citroën Jumpy, Peugeot Expert and Fiat Scudo were available with a  DW10 BTED engine, which is essentially an intercooled version of the original  design.

The DW10 was used as the basis for the new family of Duratorq Diesel engines co-developed with Ford, and it is used in the Focus, Kuga, Mondeo, C-Max and Volvo C30/S40/V50, besides various Citroën and Peugeot passenger models. It is fitted with a six-speed manual transmission or six-speed Aisin-automatic transmission (in Citroën C5 from summer 2004 onwards).

The DW10BTED4E5 and DW10C are Euro 5-compliant, and therefore still available for sale in Europe.

2014 Euro 6 variant DW10FC and DW10FD introduced selective catalytic reduction emissions control technology.

DW12
Unlike the initial DW10 designs, it was fitted with 16 valves from the beginning, and made its debut in the 2000 with the Citroën C5, Peugeot 406, Peugeot 406 Coupe and Peugeot 607, being used only in the larger models. In 2006 it was added to the PSA/Ford family, with power reaching . Land Rover used this engine in the Freelander 2, Discovery Sport and Range Rover Evoque. Available as both 160ps or 190ps, Peugeot 4007 and Citroën C-Crosser used the same motor. The unit was used in a longitudinal mounting in the Jaguar XF from 2012 until 2015 in 163 PS or 200 PS, though some early 2012 cars were available as 190 PS.

In India

The same engine, after being reworked on independently by AVL (engineering company) has been used extensively by Tata Motors in their Safari (1st Gen), Aria, Hexa, Xenon and Winger and by Mahindra and Mahindra in their XUV500 and Scorpio models. The Tata Hexa and Tata Safari (2016+) have an output of 156 PS while the Mahindra XUV500 made 155PS. While Tata Motors discontinued the engine in its Passenger Vehicle Segment in 2020 with the onset of the Bharat Stage 6 emission standards, only using a commercial grade 98 PS tuned 2.2L in the Tata Winger, Mahindra recently discontinued the XUV500 which only leaves the Mahindra Scorpio using the engine, which is also at the end of its life cycle.

The DW12C is a Euro 5-compliant, high-output version.

The DW12 RU is an updated version that meets Euro 6d emission standards, and is intended for light commercial vehicle applications where it replaces the DW10 FU. The Citroën Jumper and Peugeot Boxer (2019–) are powered by this engine. It comes in power ratings of 120 PS/300 Nm, 140 PS/340 Nm and 165 PS/370 Nm.

EW7
It was used as an entry level engine for the Citroën C5 and Citroën Xsara Picasso, the Peugeot 406, and the Peugeot 407.

The EW7A is Euro 4 only, and was no longer for sale in Europe as of January 1, 2011.

EW10
It is used widely throughout the PSA Group, including the Citroën C4, C5, Citroën Xsara Picasso and Peugeot 206, 307 and 407. A gasoline direct injection variant, called EW10 D and marketed as HPi, was briefly used in the Citroën C5 and Peugeot 406 starting in 2001, but was discontinued in 2003 due to low sales.

The EW10 J4S variant is a high performance version used in the 206 GTI 180, 206 RC, 307 Féline, 307 cc and C4 VTS. EW10 A is a further development of the EW10 J4, presenting somewhat higher power and torque due to the introduction of Variable valve timing (VVT). Fuel consumption is also decreased. Citroën usually states  and Peugeot 140 PS for the same  engine.

As of January 1, 2010 and the requirements of Euro 5 emission regulations, the EW10  (Euro 4 only) is no longer available in Europe. For most use, they are replaced with Prince engines.

EW12
The EW12 was introduced to replace the low-pressure turbo variant of the XU10. Citroën only uses it on the C8 MPV, while Peugeot, which has more a sporty image, uses it in the 406 SRi and 406 Coupe, 407, the 607 executive model and 807 MPV.

The EW12J4 is Euro 4 only, and no longer for sale in Europe as of January 1, 2011.

See also
 List of PSA engines
 Ford Duratorq engine
 PSA HDi engine

References

External links
 

EW DW
Straight-four engines
Diesel engines by model
Gasoline engines by model